Ghost Parade is a 1931 American short subject film directed by Mack Sennett.

Plot summary
A disparate group of characters are menaced in a haunted house by mice playing a xylophone, a talking dog, a gorilla, and each other.

Cast
Harry Gribbon as The Constable
Andy Clyde as Mr. Martin
Marjorie Beebe
Frank Eastman
Marion Sayers
Babe Stafford
Charles Gemora as Gorilla

External links

1931 films
Comedy mystery films
Mack Sennett Comedies short films
American black-and-white films
1931 comedy films
American comedy mystery films
American haunted house films
Educational Pictures short films
American comedy short films
1930s comedy mystery films
Films directed by Mack Sennett
1930s English-language films
1930s American films